Bethany is the name of two villages mentioned in the New Testament of the Bible: 
 Bethany near Jerusalem, today known as Al-Eizariya which means "the place of Lazarus"
 Bethany (or Bethabara) beyond the Jordan, today known as Al-Maghtas. 

It may also refer to:

Film
Bethany (film), a 2017 American horror film starring Tom Green

Music
 Bethany (band), an alternative arena rock band
 "Bethany", a version of the hymn "Nearer, My God, to Thee"

Names
 Bethany (given name), a female given name

Other places

Australia 

 Bethany, South Australia

Canada 
 Béthanie, Quebec, a hamlet roughly between Montreal and Sherbrooke
 Bethany, Lennox and Addington County, Ontario
 Bethany, Ontario, an unincorporated village in the municipality of Kawartha Lakes near Peterborough

Eswatini 
 Bethany, Eswatini

Jordan & Palestine 

 Bethany, the biblical village in ancient Palestine
 Al-Maghtas, the supposed 'Bethany beyond the Jordan' where Jesus was baptised; possibly identical with Bethabara.

Namibia 

 Bethanie, Namibia

South Africa 

 Bethanie, Free State
 Bethanie, North West
 Bethanie is also a neighborhood of Cape Town.

United Kingdom 

 Bethany, Cornwall

United States 

 Bethany Township (disambiguation)
 Bethany, Connecticut
 Bethany Beach, Delaware
 Bethany, Florida
 Bethany, Georgia
 Bethany, Illinois
 Bethany, Indiana
 Bethany, Bartholomew County, Indiana
 Bethany, Parke County, Indiana
 Bethany, Kentucky (disambiguation)
 Bethany, Louisville, neighborhood of Louisville, Kentucky
 Bethany, Louisiana and Texas
 Bethany Beach, Michigan, a part of the Shorewood-Tower Hills-Harbert, Michigan, Census-Designated Place
 Bethany, Minnesota
 Bethany, Missouri
 Bethany, Nebraska
 Bethany, New York
 Bethany, Ohio
 Bethany, Oklahoma
 Bethany, Oregon
 Bethany, Pennsylvania
 Bethany, South Carolina
 Bethany, Tennessee, in Warren County
 Bethany, Virginia
 Bethany, West Virginia
 South Bethany, Delaware
 Bethany, United States Virgin Islands

Schools and institutions 

 Bethany College (disambiguation)
 Bethany Christian Schools
 Bethany Christian Trust
 Bethany Lutheran College
 Bethany Lutheran Theological Seminary
 Bethany Theological Seminary
 Béthanie (Hong Kong)
 Bethany Home, a former residential institution for Protestant women and children in Dublin, Ireland.

See also 

 Bettany (disambiguation)
 Betania (disambiguation)
 Bethania (disambiguation)